The 1988 European Junior Swimming Championships were held from July 28 to July 31, 1988, in Amersfoort, Netherlands.

Medal table

Medal summary

Boy's events

Girl's events

J
S
European Junior Swimming Championships
European Junior Championships
Swimming
Sports competitions in Amersfoort
July 1988 sports events in Europe